The 1952 United States Senate election in Tennessee was held on November 4, 1952. Incumbent Democratic Senator and President pro tempore of the Senate Kenneth D. McKellar ran for re-election to a seventh term in office, but was defeated in the Democratic primary by U.S. Representative Al Gore Sr. Gore easily won the general election against Republican Hobart Atkins.

Democratic primary

Candidates
Kenneth McKellar, incumbent Senator since 1917 and President pro tempore of the U.S. Senate
Albert Gore Sr., U.S. Representative from Carthage
John Randolph Neal Jr., attorney, academic, and perennial candidate
Herman H. Ross, independent candidate for Senate in 1946

Results

General election

Candidates
Hobart F. Atkins, nominee for Senate in 1952 (Republican)
Richard M. Barber (Independent)
Albert Gore Sr., incumbent Senator since 1953 (Democratic)
John Randolph Neal Jr., attorney, academic, and perennial candidate (Good Government & Clean Elections)

Results

See also
1952 United States Senate elections

References

1952
Tennessee
United States Senate